The River Manifold is a river in Staffordshire, England. It is a tributary of the River Dove (which also flows through the Peak District, forming the boundary between Derbyshire and Staffordshire).

The Manifold rises at Flash Head just south of Buxton near Axe Edge, at the northern edge of the White Peak, known for its limestone beds. It continues for  before it joins the Dove. For part of its course, it runs underground (except when in spate), from Wetton Mill to Ilam. During this section it is joined by its major tributary, the River Hamps.

Villages on the river include Longnor, Hulme End  and Ilam.

Its name may come from Anglo-Saxon manig-fald = "many folds", referring to its meanders.

Manifold Way

Opened in July 1937 after the LMS handed over the trackbed to Staffordshire County Council, it is tarmacked throughout.

The Manifold Valley Visitor Centre is housed in Hulme End Station, which also has a model of the railway.

Limestone crags and caves
The limestone cliffs that fringe the valley contain several rock-climbing areas, and named rock features, including Thor's Cave and Beeston Tor, which overlooks the confluence with the River Hamps.

Mining in the Manifold valley

The Manifold valley was famous for the mining of copper and lead, and the mines at Ecton were some of the richest in the country. The discovery of Stone Age implements in some of the caves imply that minerals were mined around the Manifold valley thousands of years ago. Nowadays there is little trace of the industry that made many people (mainly the Duke of Devonshire who at one time owned the Ecton mines) very rich. The main areas of interest are around Ecton where the old spoil banks and the old engine house still remain.

Ecology
The river has been noted as being important for European bullhead and lamprey. In the underground section of the river where it resurfaces at Ilam, the bullhead have no pigmentation. It was previously a stronghold for white-clawed crayfish, but most of the river's population were wiped out by crayfish plague in 2008. Crayfish have been noted in the tributaries of the Manifold and it is hoped that re-colonisation can be achieved by the surviving upstream crayfish.

See also
Rivers of the United Kingdom

References

External links

 Staffordshire Past Track project: historical photos

Rivers of Derbyshire
Rivers of Staffordshire
Rivers and valleys of the Peak District
1Manifold